The 2001 Cincinnati Reds season was the 132nd season for the franchise in Major League Baseball. It consisted of the Cincinnati Reds attempting to win the National League Central. The Reds were managed by Bob Boone.

Offseason
 November 16, 2000: Chris Stynes was traded by the Reds to the Boston Red Sox for Michael Coleman and Donnie Sadler.
 March 21, 2001: Drew Henson and Michael Coleman were traded by the Reds to the New York Yankees for Wily Mo Peña.

Regular season
May 8, 2001: Randy Johnson of the Arizona Diamondbacks struck out 20 Cincinnati Reds batters, but left the game after nine innings with a no-decision tied at 1-1. The Reds scored two runs in the top of the 11th inning but the Diamondbacks scored three runs in the bottom of the inning to win, 4-3.

Season standings

Record vs. opponents

Notable transactions
 June 23, 2001: Scott Service was signed as a free agent by the Reds.
 July 1, 2001: José Rijo was signed as a free agent by the Reds.
 July 19, 2001: Alex Ochoa was traded by the Reds to the Colorado Rockies for Robin Jennings and Todd Walker.

Roster

Player stats

Batting

Starters by position
Note: Pos = Position; G = Games played; AB = At bats; H = Hits; Avg. = Batting average; HR = Home runs; RBI = Runs batted in

Other batters
Note: G = Games played; AB = At bats; H = Hits; Avg. = Batting average; HR = Home runs; RBI = Runs batted in

Pitching

Starting pitchers
Note: G = Games pitched; IP = Innings pitched; W = Wins; L = Losses; ERA = Earned run average; SO = Strikeouts

Other pitchers
Note; G = Games pitched; IP = Innings pitched; W = Wins; L = Losses; ERA = Earned run average; SO = Strikeouts

Relief pitchers 
Note: G = Games pitched; W = Wins; L = Losses; SV = Saves; ERA = Earned run average; SO = Strikeouts

Farm system 

LEAGUE CHAMPIONS: Louisville, Billings

References

External links

2001 Cincinnati Reds season at Baseball Reference

Cincinnati Reds seasons
Cincinnati Reds Season, 2001
Cinc